William Abbot (fl. 1437) was an English politician who served as Member of Parliament for Melcombe Regis in 1437. He was the son of John Abbot, another MP, and two of his brothers, John and Robert, were also MPs.

References

English MPs 1423
Members of the Parliament of England (pre-1707) for Melcombe Regis
Year of birth unknown
Year of death unknown